Musk deer can refer to any one, or all seven, of the species that make up Moschus, the only extant genus of the family Moschidae. Despite being commonly called deer, they are not true deer belonging to the family Cervidae, but rather their family is closely related to Bovidae, the group that contains antelopes, bovines, sheep, and goats. The musk deer family differs from cervids, or true deer, by lacking antlers and preorbital glands also, possessing only a single pair of teats, a gallbladder, a caudal gland, a pair of canine tusks and—of particular economic importance to humans—a musk gland.

Musk deer live mainly in forested and alpine scrub habitats in the mountains of South Asia, notably the Himalayas. Moschids, the proper term when referring to this type of deer rather than one/multiple species of musk deer, are entirely Asian in their present distribution, being extinct in Europe where the earliest musk deer are known to have existed from Oligocene deposits.

Characteristics

Musk deer resemble small deer, with a stocky build and hind legs longer than their front legs. The feet of musk deer are adapted for climbing in rough terrain. Like the Chinese water deer, a cervid, they have no antlers, but the males do have enlarged upper canines, forming sabre-like tusks. The dental formula is similar to that of true deer: 

The musk gland is found only in adult males. It lies in a sac located between the genitals and the umbilicus, and its secretions are most likely used to attract mates.

Musk deer are herbivores, living in hilly, forested environments, generally far from human habitation. Like true deer, they eat mainly leaves, flowers, and grasses, with some mosses and lichens. They are solitary animals and maintain well-defined territories, which they scent mark with their caudal glands. Musk deer are generally shy and either nocturnal or crepuscular.

Males leave their territories during the rutting season and compete for mates, using their tusks as weapons. In order to indicate their area, musk deer build latrines. These locations can be used to identify the musk deer's existence, number, and preferred habitat in the wild. Female musk deer give birth to a single fawn after about 150–180 days. The newborn young are very small and essentially motionless for the first month of their lives, a feature that helps them remain hidden from predators.

Musk deer have been hunted for their scent glands, which are  used in perfumes. The glands can fetch up to $45,000/kg on the black market. It is rumored that ancient royalty wore the scent of the musk deer, and that it is an aphrodisiac.

Evolution

Musk deer are the only surviving members of the Moschidae, a family with a fossil record extending over 25 million years to the late Oligocene. The group was abundant across Eurasia and North America until the late Miocene, but underwent a substantial decline, with no Pliocene fossil record and Moschus the only genus since the Pleistocene. The oldest records of the genus Moschus are known from the Late Miocene (Turolian) of Lufeng, China.

Taxonomy 
While they have been traditionally classified as members of the deer family (as the subfamily "Moschinae") and all the species were classified as one species (under Moschus moschiferus), recent studies have indicated that moschids are more closely related to bovids (antelope, goats, sheep and cattle).

See also
Vampire deer

References

 
Mammals of Asia
Extant Miocene first appearances
Taxa named by Carl Linnaeus